Mohd Faizal bin Muhamad (born 3 March 1989) is a Malaysian football player who plays as centre-back for Malaysian club Melaka United. He is also a former member of Malaysia senior football team and Malaysia U-23 squad.

In November 2010, Faizal was called up to the Malaysia national squad by coach K. Rajagopal for the 2010 AFF Suzuki Cup. Malaysia won the 2010 AFF Suzuki Cup title for the first time in their history. He was loaned to Terengganu FA for 2011 Malaysia Cup and helped the team reach the final before losing 2–1 to Negeri Sembilan FA. He played all 90 minutes in the final, performing a great partnership with Mohd Marzuki Yusof.

Career statistics

Club

Honours

International
 2010 AFF Suzuki Cup: Winner

Notes

References

External links
 Biography: Faizal Muhammad
 Faizal Muhammad at ifball.com
 Faizal Muhammad at footballmalaysia.com

1989 births
Living people
Malaysian people of Malay descent
Malaysian footballers
Malaysia international footballers
Terengganu FC players
People from Terengganu
Malaysia Super League players
Association football central defenders
Footballers at the 2010 Asian Games
Melaka United F.C. players
Asian Games competitors for Malaysia